Marc Gafni (born Marc Winiarz; 1960) is an American philosopher, author, and rabbi who became a New Age spiritual teacher with a focus on Integral Theory, Eros, and "outrageous love".  He is the president of the Center for the Integral Wisdom, which he co-founded with Ken Wilber and he is the president of the Office for the Future. He is the author of twelve books including the USA Book News Award for  Your Unique Self: The Radical Path to Personal Enlightenment and Radical Kabbalah  He hosted a National television show in Israel called Tachat Gafno from 1999-2002.

Gafni has been the subject of multiple allegations of sexual misconduct  over many years, which he has denied.

Biography
Gafni was born in 1960 to Holocaust survivors in Pittsfield, Massachusetts. Gafni was educated at Modern-Orthodox yeshivas in the New York City area. In the 1980s, while attending Yeshiva University, Gafni worked with Jewish Public School Youth (JPSY), an organization providing Jewish social clubs in public schools. In 1988, Gafni also worked as a rabbi in Boca Raton, Florida. After making aliyah, Gafni served as rabbi of the West Bank settlement of Tzofim. When Gafni moved to Israel in 1988, he Hebraicized his name. "Winiarz", Polish for "vintner", is related to the Hebrew word , which means "grape"—thus the name "Gafni." Gafni has three children from previous marriages and one child with Mariana Caplan.

Higher education

Secular education
Gafni majored in philosophy as an undergraduate at Queens College and earned his Doctorate in Philosophy from Wolfson College at Oxford University. His doctoral thesis was entitled, "The Theology of Acosmic Humanism: Mordechai Lainer of Izbica."

Religious Ordination 
Gafni states that he currently holds ordination from non-denominational Rabbi Gershon Winkler, received in 2008. Gafni had received Orthodox semikhah from Rabbi Shlomo Riskin and Renewal semikhah from Rabbi Zalman Schachter-Shalomi.  However, as a result of the various allegations against Gafni, Gafni returned his rabbinical ordination from Rabbi Shlomo Riskin to spare his former teacher "any further embarrassment" after Riskin expressed he wanted to revoke Gafni's ordination on the grounds that Gafni's theology had extended "beyond the bounds of Orthodoxy". His other rabbinical ordination by Reb Zalman Schachter-Shalomi was revoked in 2006. In 2006, The Alliance for Jewish Renewal has condemned Gafni's behavior stated, "Marc Gafni is not a rabbi or spiritual leader recognized by ALEPH: Alliance for Jewish Renewal."

Teachings 
Gafni's teachings are described as integral or world spirituality, incorporating traditional religious studies with contemporary themes, and are aimed at spirituality for people who do not identify with one specific religion. Gafni describes himself and his students as "dual citizens" of both their native traditional religion and the broader themes of "world spirituality". He advocates a new set of teachings around eros, sexuality, and relationships in his book Mystery of Love and CD set Erotic and the Holy. At the core of his message is what Gafni refers to as the Unique Self. Gafni believes that "the sexual is the ultimate Spiritual Master" and has written "I was convinced from an early age that religion had lost what I believed must have been its original erotic vitality. I knew that the sexual, if liberated and ethically expressed, must somehow hold the mystery of return to the much larger-than-sexual Eros."

Integral Theory 
In 2011, Gafni, Mariana Caplan, Sally Kempton, and Lori Galperin founded the Center for World Spirituality, which later evolved into the Center for Integral Wisdom. At the Center, Gafni and Ken Wilber founded a Wisdom Council to envision a spirituality based on Integral Principles. The Wisdom Council, included members such as Gafni, Wilber, Tony Robbins, Warren Farrell, Lori Galperin, Sally Kempton. The co-chair of Center for World Spirituality was Whole Foods CEO John Mackey.

Gafni was a Scholar in Residence at the Integral Institute and the Director of the Integral Spiritual Experience but was asked to leave after the 2011 allegations of his sexual misconduct.

Writings
, Gafni is the author of twelve books on spirituality and religion. He wrote Radical Kabbalah, a two-volume work published by Integral Publishers in 2012. In 2012, he published Your Unique Self: The Radical Path to Personal Enlightenment with a foreword written by Wilber, which won a 2012 USA Best Book Awards in Spirituality: General category.

Television
While in Israel, Gafni hosted , a television program broadcast on Israel's Channel 2. Gafni also did a series of weekly television spots with Israeli comedian Gil Kopatch on biblical wisdom for every day life.

Allegations of sexual assault
Gafni has been accused of sexual assault multiple times dating back to the 1980s.

Teenage allegations 
In 2004, Gafni was accused by two women of sexual assaulting them during the 1980s when they were teenagers. In 2004, he acknowledged a nine-month relationship with a 14-year-old girl when he was 19. He denied the relationship was abusive, describing it as consensual.

In January 2016, Judy Mitzner said that she was one of two teenage girls whom Gafni allegedly molested in New York City in 1986. She reiterated those assertions on the Dr. Phil show of January 19, 2018, in which Gafni appeared. Mitzner was 16 and Gafni was 24 and he was her Jewish Youth Leader at the time.

Also in January 2016, an unnamed woman wrote that she was married to Gafni from 1999 to 2004 in an opinion piece in The Times of Israel. The article was in response to a New York Times article about Gafni the preceding week. She catalogued what she described as her story of abuse and wrote that she had gone public to "Protect some girl. Protect some woman. Some student. Some unsuspecting soul."

Within two weeks of the publication of the piece in The Times of Israel, Sara Kabakov revealed in The Forward that she was the other formerly unnamed teenage girl who had been abused by Gafni in the early 1980s, beginning when she was thirteen years old. Gafni commented, "she was 14 going on 35, and I never forced her."  In a subsequent article, The Forward published Gafni's response together with the analysis of sexual abuse experts. Gafni states they were 14 and 19 year old teenagers and describes their relationship as "a mutual expression of teenage love." Gafni included polygraph results to support his claim that his relationship with Kabakov was consensual. It was completed by Dr. Gordon Barland, the former director of polygraph research for the Department of Defense. Dr. Barland concluded that Gafni had answered each question truthfully although confidence in his conclusion was lower than would otherwise be the case due to the time elapsed. Afterwards, Kabakov responded to Gafni's comments and reiterated her claim that the relationship was not consensual. In February 2017, the National Coalition for Men published an article by Gafni in which he defended himself, calling the allegations "a long-standing smear campaign". 

In 2020, Kabakov and Mitzner filed suit against both Gafni and Yeshiva University under the recently passed New York Child Victims Act.

Bayit Hadash allegations 
In 2006, after he moved to Israel, Gafni was accused by five women who attended the  spiritual center in Jaffa, which Gafni opened in the late 1990s. Gafni acknowledged relationships with some of the women. However, he characterized the relationships as consensual and supported his claim by posting polygraph results on his website. The Bayit Hadash co-founders and other prominent leaders expressed that they felt betrayed by how deeply Gafni had misled them as well as regret for having supported him.
Back in the United States, Gafni sent a remorseful letter to his congregation saying he regretted his actions and added "Clearly all of this and more indicates that in these regards I am sick. I need to acknowledge that sickness and to get help for it." Gafni later explained that he penned and signed the letter not as an admission of guilt, but in an attempt to cool the controversy.

2011 allegations and 2016 repercussions 
Due to additional abuse allegations in 2011, including Gafni's sexual involvement with a student, Integral Life, one of Gafni's promoters, deleted his contributions from its website and announced that it was distancing itself from him. Tami Simon, CEO of Sounds True, canceled her planned publication of Gafni's book, Your Unique Self, and issued a statement denouncing him and the ways he had lied to her. The board of directors of the Center for World Spirituality, an organization co-founded by Gafni and of which he is CEO, issued a statement of "unequivocal support" for Gafni. Wilber first separated from Gafni, but the two reconciled and Wilber rejoined Gafni at the Center for World Spirituality. Your Unique Self was published by Integral Publishers. 

In 2016, a number of new-age spiritual leaders, who had previously worked with and endorsed Gafni, publicly withdrew their support and wrote a public statement disavowing themselves from him, including Deepak Chopra, Joan Borysenko, Andrew Harvey, author Jean Houston, and Stephen Dinan. Also in 2016, a workshop co-led by Gafni and Sally Kempton at the Esalen Institute was cancelled after public outcry about Gafni’s decades-long history of abuse allegations, triggered in part by an article in the NY Times, as well as by a petition from over 100 rabbis denouncing Gafni. In response to the petition, a group of Gafni’s close former students published a public letter disavowing him as a teacher, accusing him of multiple forms of abuse, deceptions, and betrayals, and explaining why they consider him to be dangerous.

Bibliography

1999 A Certain Spirit {Vadai}: Re-Defining Certainty
1999 Uncertainty {Safek}: Reclaiming the Spirituality of Uncertainty
2002 Soul Prints: Your Path to Fulfillment 
2002 Seelenmuster 
2003 The Mystery of Love 
2005 Who is Afraid of Lilith? Rereading the Kabbalah of the Feminine Shadow
2006 The Erotic and the Holy 
2012 Your Unique Self: The Radical Path to Personal Enlightenment 
2012 Radical Kabbalah 
2014  Loving Your Way to Enlightenment 
2014 Tears: Reclaiming Ritual, Integral Religion, and Rosh Hashanah 
2014 Self in Integral Evolutionary Mysticism 
2014 Your Unique Self: An Integral Path to Success 3.0 
2017 "A Return to Eros: The Radical Experience of Being Fully Alive"

References

20th-century American rabbis
1960 births
Living people
New Age writers
American spiritual writers
Integral theory (Ken Wilber)
American self-help writers
Child sexual abuse in the United States
21st-century American rabbis